Kristoffer Kompen (born 14 August 1984 in Oslo, Norway) is a Norwegian Jazz musician (trombone) and composer, known from a series of performances and recordings within bands like "Jazzin' Babies" and with musicians like Eirik Hegdal, Eyolf Dale, David Skinner, Håkon Storm-Mathisen and Kåre Nymark.

Career 
Kompen studied music and music education at the Norwegian Academy of Music (2005–11), and also attended the Agder Musikkonservatorium in Kristiansand (2004/2005) and Kungliga Musikhögskolan in Stockholm (2007/2008). He has toured several times with Rikskonsertene, various big bands and ensembles, theater productions and a variety of bands in jazz and related music. Compensation has performed in numerous occasions, including with Kringkastingsorkesteret in Den Norske Opera, August 2011.

At 15 years old he joined the orchestra "Jazzin' Babies", and later joined bands like Staffan William-Olsson Sextet and Kåre Nymark Band. He also has two own bands, the Swedish-Norwegian Union Rhythm Kings and Kompen Quintet. Within the latter band, Kompen released his acclaimed debut solo album Short Stories of Happiness in 2011. The reviewer Erling Wicklund of the NRK Jazz states: "The compositions by Kompen are also mysterious, but exciting enough". On his second solo album A Tribute to Jack Teagarden (2013), he has chosen to honor his great inspiration Jack Teagarden (1905–64) by interpreting a dozen tunes from his repertoar. This is to sets the benchmark high as he was the leading jazztrombonisten from the 1920s right up to the bebop revolution of the 1940s. Kompen delivers an even more praised album this time.

Kompen was musically responsible for the ending tour "Swing It, Love It Dig It" by Rikskonsertene 2012 and lead the opening concert of the Oslo Jazzfestival in Den Norske Opera the same year.

Honors 
2009: Awarded a Scholarship by Lions Club
2010: Awarded the Young Star Scholarship by Statkraft

Discography

Solo albums 
2011: Short Stories of Happiness (Schmell Records) 
2013: A Tribute to Jack Teagarden (Herman Records)
2014: Agdergata 1 (Kompen Records)

Collaborations 
Within Jazzin' Babies
2004: Up and Go! (Herman Records)
2006: Rag and Roll! (Herman Records)
2008: Live in Holland (Hermann Records)

With other projects
2006: Matsukaze (AIM Records), with Håkon Storm-Mathisen
2007: The Lesson (Schmell Records), with Norsk Kurveunion
2008: A Hot Reunion (Herman Records), with Union Rhythm Kings
2008: When The Stevdore Stomps (Stompers), with Stockholm Stompers 
2008: Forever Candid (Alfred Records/Bonnier Amigo Music), with Marthe Valle
2009: Den Blåaste Natt (Talik), with Jo Skaansar
2010: Big Shit (Schmell), with T8
2011: New Objectiv (Kennel Records), with Ninas Pace
2011: Go Marching Home (Kennel Records), with ONTZ!
2012: The Death Defying Unicorn (Rune Grammofon), within Trondheim Jazz Orchestra together with Motorpsycho & Ståle Storløkken, live at Moldejazz 2012
2012: New Surroundings (Schmell Records), with Kåre Nymark

References

External links 

20th-century Norwegian trombonists
21st-century Norwegian trombonists
Norwegian jazz trombonists
Male trombonists
Norwegian jazz composers
Male jazz composers
1984 births
Living people
Musicians from Oslo
21st-century trombonists
20th-century Norwegian male musicians
21st-century Norwegian male musicians
Union Rhythm Kings members